Cristo Rey is a 2013 Dominican Republic drama film written and directed by Leticia Tonos. It was screened in the Contemporary World Cinema section at the 2013 Toronto International Film Festival. It was selected as the Dominican entry for the Best Foreign Language Film at the 87th Academy Awards, but was not nominated.

Plot
Haitians and Dominicans are living in the Santo Domingo slums, where the two groups are at violent odds in a turbulent political and social climate. Janvier and Rudy are half-brothers who are fighting for the love of the same woman. Because of his Haitian roots, Janvier is recruited by the drug trafficking gang that rules the Cristo Rey barrio. He is assigned the job of looking after the gang leader's sister, Jocelyn. Rudy, who is Dominican, used to be in a relationship with Jocelyn, and cannot abide the thought of Janvier spending time with her. He becomes determined to get her back, no matter the cost. Jocelyn and Janvier end up falling in love, and must devise a plan to escape Cristo Rey, where no future for the two of them seems possible.

Cast
 Akari Endo
 Yasser Michelén
 James Saintil

See also
 List of submissions to the 87th Academy Awards for Best Foreign Language Film
 List of Dominican submissions for the Academy Award for Best Foreign Language Film

References

External links
 

2013 films
2013 drama films
Dominican Republic drama films
2010s Spanish-language films